Top 10 is a Canadian television program broadcast on NHL Network consisting of a countdown of an ice-hockey related theme – ranking, for example, great performances, memorable moments or dramatic events in NHL history. It airs weekdays at 6 PM.

External links 
 ChannelCanada.com article

2000s Canadian sports television series
2005 Canadian television series debuts
2010s Canadian sports television series
National Hockey League on television